

This is a list of the National Register of Historic Places listings in Northampton County, Pennsylvania.

This is intended to be a complete list of the properties and districts on the National Register of Historic Places in Northampton County, Pennsylvania, United States.

There are 63 properties and districts listed on the National Register in the county, including 4 sites designated as National Historic Landmarks.

Current listings

|}

Former listing

|}

See also
 List of National Historic Landmarks in Pennsylvania
 List of Pennsylvania state historical markers in Northampton County
 National Register of Historic Places listings in Pennsylvania

References

External links

Buildings and structures in Northampton County, Pennsylvania
History of Northampton County, Pennsylvania
Northampton County
 
Tourist attractions in Northampton County, Pennsylvania